The J. W. Callahan House is a Classical Revival-style house in Bainbridge, Georgia that was built in c. 1907. It was listed on the National Register of Historic Places in 1976.

It was home of John Wesley Callahan, steamship businessman. It is a two-and-a-half-story house with a dormered hipped roof supported by a monumental portico with four Corinthian columns. It has a curved one-story porch around three sides of the house.

References

Houses on the National Register of Historic Places in Georgia (U.S. state)
Neoclassical architecture in Georgia (U.S. state)
National Register of Historic Places in Decatur County, Georgia
Houses completed in 1907